Protoscalidion is an extinct genus of ground beetles in the family Carabidae. This genus has a single species, Protoscalidion rugiae.

References

Lebiinae
Monotypic Carabidae genera